

Events

Pre-1600
 220 – Emperor Xian of Han is forced to abdicate the throne by Cao Cao's son Cao Pi, ending the Han dynasty.
 361 – Julian enters Constantinople as sole Roman Emperor.
 861 – Assassination of the Abbasid caliph al-Mutawakkil by the Turkish guard, who raise al-Muntasir to the throne, start of the "Anarchy at Samarra".
 969 – Byzantine Emperor Nikephoros II Phokas is assassinated by his wife Theophano and her lover, the later Emperor John I Tzimiskes.
1041 – Michael V, adoptive son of Empress Zoë of Byzantium, is proclaimed emperor of the Eastern Roman Empire.
1282 – Battle of Orewin Bridge: Llywelyn ap Gruffudd, the last native Prince of Wales, is killed at Cilmeri near Builth Wells in mid-Wales.

1601–1900
1602 – A surprise attack by forces under the command of Charles Emmanuel I, Duke of Savoy, and his brother-in-law, Philip III of Spain, is repelled by the citizens of Geneva. (Commemorated annually by the Fête de l'Escalade.)
1640 – The Root and Branch petition, signed by 15,000 Londoners calling for the abolition of the episcopacy, is presented to the Long Parliament.
1675 – Antonio de Vea expedition enters San Rafael Lake in western Patagonia.
1688 – Glorious Revolution: James II of England, while trying to flee to France, throws the Great Seal of the Realm into the River Thames.
1792 – French Revolution: King Louis XVI of France is put on trial for treason by the National Convention.
1815 – The U.S. Senate creates a select committee on finance and a uniform national currency, predecessor of the United States Senate Committee on Finance.
1816 – Indiana becomes the 19th U.S. state.
1868 – Paraguayan War: Brazilian troops defeat the Paraguayan Army at the Battle of Avay.
1899 – Second Boer War: In the Battle of Magersfontein the Boers commanded by general Piet Cronjé inflict a defeat on the forces of the British Empire commanded by Lord Methuen trying to relieve the Siege of Kimberley.

1901–present
1901 – Guglielmo Marconi transmits the first transatlantic radio signal from Poldhu, Cornwall, England to Saint John's, Newfoundland.
1905 – A workers' uprising occurs in Kyiv, Ukraine (then part of the Russian Empire), and establishes the Shuliavka Republic.
1907 – The New Zealand Parliament Buildings are almost completely destroyed by fire.
1913 – More than two years after it was stolen from the Louvre, Leonardo da Vinci's painting Mona Lisa is recovered in Florence, Italy. The thief, Vincenzo Peruggia, is immediately arrested.
1917 – World War I: British General Edmund Allenby enters Jerusalem on foot and declares martial law.
1920 – Irish War of Independence: In retaliation for a recent IRA ambush, British forces burn and loot numerous buildings in Cork city. Many civilians report being beaten, shot at, robbed and verbally abused by British forces.
1925 – Roman Catholic papal encyclical Quas primas introduces the Feast of Christ the King.
1927 – Guangzhou Uprising: Communist Red Guards launch an uprising in Guangzhou, China, taking over most of the city and announcing the formation of a Guangzhou Soviet.
1931 – Statute of Westminster 1931: The British Parliament establishes legislative equality between the UK and the Dominions of the Commonwealth—Australia, Canada, Newfoundland, New Zealand, South Africa, and Ireland.
1934 – Bill Wilson, co-founder of Alcoholics Anonymous, takes his last drink and enters treatment for the final time.
1936 – Abdication Crisis: Edward VIII's abdication as King of the United Kingdom and the British Dominions beyond the Seas, and Emperor of India, becomes effective.
1937 – Second Italo-Ethiopian War: Italy leaves the League of Nations.
1941 – World War II: Germany and Italy declare war on the United States, following the Americans' declaration of war on the Empire of Japan in the wake of the attack on Pearl Harbor. The United States, in turn, declares war on them.
  1941   – World War II: Poland declares war on the Empire of Japan.
  1941   – World War II: The Imperial Japanese Navy suffers its first loss of surface vessels during the Battle of Wake Island.
1946 – The United Nations International Children's Emergency Fund (UNICEF) is established.
1948 – Arab–Israeli War: The United Nations passes General Assembly Resolution 194, creating a Conciliation Commission to mediate the conflict.
1958 – French Upper Volta and French Dahomey gain self-government from France, becoming the Republic of Upper Volta (now Burkina Faso) and the Republic of Dahomey (now Benin), respectively, and joining the French Community.
1960 – French forces crack down in a violent clash with protesters in French Algeria during a visit by French President Charles de Gaulle.
1962 – Arthur Lucas, convicted of murder, is the last person to be executed in Canada.
1964 – Che Guevara speaks at the United Nations General Assembly in New York City.
1972 – Apollo 17 becomes the sixth and final Apollo mission to land on the Moon.
1978 – The Lufthansa heist is committed by a group led by Lucchese family associate Jimmy Burke. It was the largest cash robbery ever committed on American soil, at that time.
1980 – The Comprehensive Environmental Response, Compensation, and Liability Act (Superfund) is enacted by the U.S. Congress.
1981 – El Mozote massacre: Armed forces in El Salvador kill an estimated 900 civilians in an anti-guerrilla campaign during the Salvadoran Civil War.
1990 – Demonstrations by students and workers across Albania begin, which eventually trigger the fall of communism in Albania.
  1990   – Several fatal collisions in the 1990 Interstate 75 fog disaster result in a total of 12 deaths and 42 being injured
1993 – A block of the Highland Towers condominium complex collapses following a landslide caused by heavy rain and water flowing from a construction site at Ampang district in Kuala Lumpur, Malaysia. 48 of its residents die, including one who died in hospital after being rescued alive, leaving only two survivors.
1994 – First Chechen War: Russian President Boris Yeltsin orders Russian troops into Chechnya.
  1994   – A bomb explodes on Philippine Airlines Flight 434, en route from Manila, Philippines, to Tokyo, Japan, killing one. The captain is able to land the plane safely.
1997 – The Kyoto Protocol opens for signature.
1998 – Thai Airways Flight 261 crashes near Surat Thani Airport, killing 101. The pilot flying the Airbus A310-200 is thought to have suffered spatial disorientation.
1999 – SATA Air Açores Flight 530M crashes into Pico da Esperança on São Jorge Island in the Azores, killing 35.
2001 – China joins the World Trade Organization (WTO).
2005 – The Buncefield Oil Depot catches fire in Hemel Hempstead, England.
  2005   – Cronulla riots: Thousands of White Australians demonstrate against ethnic violence resulting in a riot against anyone thought to be Lebanese in Cronulla, New South Wales; these are followed up by retaliatory ethnic attacks on Cronulla.
2006 – The International Conference to Review the Global Vision of the Holocaust is opened in Tehran, Iran, by then-president Mahmoud Ahmadinejad; nations such as Israel and the United States express concern.
  2006   – Felipe Calderón, the President of Mexico, launches a military-led offensive to put down the drug cartel violence in the state of Michoacán. This effort is often regarded as the first event in the Mexican Drug War.
2007 – Insurgency in the Maghreb: Two car bombs explode in Algiers, Algeria, one near the Supreme Constitutional Court and the other near the offices of the United Nations.
2008 – Bernie Madoff is arrested and charged with securities fraud in a $50 billion Ponzi scheme.
2009 – Finnish game developer Rovio Entertainment releases the hit mobile game Angry Birds internationally on iOS.
2012 – At least 125 people are killed and up to 200 injured in bombings in the Alawite village of Aqrab, Syria.
2017 – New York City Subway bombing: A pipe bomb partially detonates in the New York City Subway, in the Times Square–42nd Street/Port Authority Bus Terminal. Four people are injured, including the perpetrator.
2019 – The results of the 2019 Bougainvillean independence referendum are announced. The results are overwhelmingly one-sided. Over 98% of voters vote for Bougainville's independence.
2020 – The Food and Drug Administration issues an Emergency Use Authorization on the Pfizer–BioNTech COVID-19 vaccine, the first COVID-19 vaccine to be approved by the agency.

Births

Pre-1600
1445 – Eberhard I, Duke of Württemberg (d. 1496)
1465 – Ashikaga Yoshihisa, Japanese shogun (d. 1489)
1475 – Pope Leo X (d. 1521)
1566 – Manuel Cardoso, Portuguese organist and composer (d. 1650)
1595 – Heo Mok, Korean politician, poet and scholar (d. 1682)

1601–1900
1613 – Amar Singh Rathore, Rajput nobleman (d. 1644)
1712 – Francesco Algarotti, Italian poet, philosopher, and critic (d. 1764)
1725 – George Mason, American lawyer and politician (d. 1792)
1758 – Carl Friedrich Zelter, German composer, conductor, and educator (d. 1832)
1761 – Gian Domenico Romagnosi, Italian physicist, economist, and jurist (d. 1835)
1781 – David Brewster, Scottish physicist, mathematician, and astronomer (d. 1868)
1801 – Christian Dietrich Grabbe, German poet and playwright (d. 1836)
1803 – Hector Berlioz, French composer, conductor, and critic (d. 1869)
1810 – Alfred de Musset, French dramatist, poet, and novelist (d. 1857)
1830 – Kamehameha V of Hawaii (d. 1872)
1837 – Webster Paulson, English civil engineer (d. 1887)
1838 – John Labatt, Canadian brewer and businessman (d. 1915)
1843 – Robert Koch, German microbiologist and physician, Nobel Prize laureate (d. 1910)
1856 – Georgi Plekhanov, Russian philosopher, theorist, and author (d. 1918)
1858 – Vladimir Nemirovich-Danchenko, Russian director, producer, and playwright (d. 1943)
1861 – Frederick Eveleigh-de-Moleyns, 5th Baron Ventry, British Army officer and Anglo-Irish peer (d. 1923)
1863 – Annie Jump Cannon, American astronomer and academic (d. 1941)
1872 – René Bull, British illustrator and photographer (d. 1942)
1873 – Josip Plemelj, Slovenian mathematician and academic (d. 1967)
1875 – Yehuda Leib Maimon, Moldovan-Israeli rabbi and politician (d. 1962)
1880 – Frank Tarrant, Australian cricketer and umpire (d. 1951)
1882 – Subramania Bharati, Indian journalist and poet (d. 1921)
  1882   – Max Born, German physicist and mathematician, Nobel Prize laureate (d. 1970)
  1882   – Fiorello H. La Guardia, American lawyer and politician, 99th Mayor of New York City (d. 1947)
1884 – Piet Ooms, Dutch swimmer and water polo player (d. 1961)
1889 – Walter Knott, American farmer and businessman, founded Knott's Berry Farm (d. 1981)
1890 – Carlos Gardel, French-Argentinian singer-songwriter and actor (d. 1935)
  1890   – Mark Tobey, American-Swiss painter and educator (d. 1976)
1892 – Arnold Majewski, Finnish military hero of Polish descent (d. 1942)
1893 – Leo Ornstein, Russian-American pianist and composer (d. 2002)
1897 – Ronald Skirth, English soldier (d. 1977)
1899 – Julio de Caro, Argentinian violinist, composer, and conductor (d. 1980)
1900 – Hermína Týrlová, Czechoslovakian animator, screenwriter, and film director (d. 1993)
1900 – Gerd Arntz, German Modernist artist, co-creator of Isotype (d. 1988)

1901–present
1904 – Marge, American cartoonist (d. 1993)
1905 – Robert Henriques, English farmer, author, and broadcaster (d. 1967)
  1905   – Gilbert Roland, Mexican-American actor and singer (d. 1994)
1908 – Elliott Carter, American composer and academic (d. 2012)
  1908   – Manoel de Oliveira, Portuguese actor, director, producer, and screenwriter (d. 2015)
  1908   – Hákun Djurhuus, Faroese educator and politician, fourth Prime Minister of the Faroe Islands (d. 1987)
  1908   – Amon Göth, Austrian Nazi war criminal (d. 1946)
1909 – Ronald McKie, Australian soldier, journalist, and author (d. 1991)
1910 – Mildred Cleghorn, Native American chairwoman and educator (d. 1997)
1911 – Val Guest, English-American director, producer, screenwriter, and composer (d. 2006)
  1911   – Naguib Mahfouz, Egyptian author, playwright, and screenwriter, Nobel Prize laureate (d. 2006)
  1911   – Qian Xuesen, Chinese aerodynamicist and academic (d. 2009)
1912 – Carlo Ponti, Italian-Swiss film producer (d. 2007)
1913 – Jean Marais, French actor and director (d. 1998)
1916 – Pérez Prado, Cuban-Mexican singer-songwriter, pianist, and bandleader (d. 1989)
  1916   – Elena Garro, Mexican author and playwright (d. 1998)
1918 – Clinton Adams, American painter and historian (d. 2002)
  1918   – Aleksandr Solzhenitsyn, Russian novelist, historian, and short story writer, Nobel Prize laureate (d. 2008)
1919 – Cliff Michelmore, English television host and producer (d. 2016)
  1919   – Marie Windsor, American actress (d. 2000)
1920 – Mary Ivy Burks, American environmental activist (d. 2007)
  1920   – Denis Jenkinson, English motorcycle racer and journalist (d. 1996)
1921 – Ilmar Laaban, Estonian poet and publicist (d. 2000)
  1921   – Liz Smith, English actress (d. 2016)
1922 – Grigoris Bithikotsis, Greek singer-songwriter (d. 2005)
  1922   – Dilip Kumar, Indian actor, director, and screenwriter (d. 2021)
  1922   – Maila Nurmi, Finnish-American actress, producer, and screenwriter (d. 2008)
  1922   – Grace Paley, American short story writer and poet (d. 2007)
1923 – Betsy Blair, American actress and dancer (d. 2009)
  1923   – Lillian Cahn, Hungarian-born American businesswoman, co-founded Coach, Inc. (d. 2013)
  1923   – Morrie Turner, American comics creator (d. 2014)
1924 – Doc Blanchard, American football player and colonel (d. 2009)
1925 – Aaron Feuerstein, American businessman and philanthropist (d. 2021)
  1925   – Paul Greengard, American neuroscientist and academic, Nobel Prize laureate (d. 2019)
  1925   – James Sullivan, American politician (d. 2012) 
1926 – Big Mama Thornton, American singer-songwriter (d. 1984)
1927 – John Buscema, American illustrator (d. 2002)
1929 – Axel Anderson, German actor and production manager (d. 2012)
  1929   – Subhash Gupte, Indian cricketer (d. 2002)
1930 – Chus Lampreave, Spanish actress (d. 2016)
  1930   – Jean-Louis Trintignant, French actor, director, and screenwriter (d. 2022)
1931 – Rajneesh, Indian guru, mystic, and educator (d. 1990)
  1931   – Ronald Dworkin, American philosopher and scholar (d. 2013)
  1931   – Rita Moreno, Puerto Rican-American actress, singer, and dancer
1932 – Enrique Bermúdez, Nicaraguan colonel and engineer (d. 1991)
  1932   – Keith Waldrop, American author and poet
1933 – Aquilino Pimentel, Jr., Filipino civil servant and politician, 23rd President of the Senate of the Philippines (d. 2019)
1934 – Salim Durani, Afghan-Indian cricketer
1935 – Pranab Mukherjee, Indian journalist and politician, 13th President of India (d. 2020)
  1935   – Elmer Vasko, Canadian ice hockey player (d. 1998)
1936 – Taku Yamasaki, Japanese politician
  1936   – Hans van den Broek, Dutch lawyer and politician, Dutch Minister of Foreign Affairs
1937 – Jim Harrison, American novelist, essayist, and poet (d. 2016)
1938 – Enrico Macias, Algerian-French singer-songwriter and guitarist
  1938   – McCoy Tyner, American jazz musician (d. 2020)
1939 – Tom Hayden, American activist and politician (d. 2016)
  1939   – Thomas McGuane, American novelist, short story writer, and screenwriter
1940 – David Gates, American singer-songwriter, guitarist, and producer 
  1940   – Donna Mills, American actress and producer
1941 – Max Baucus, American lawyer, politician, and diplomat, 11th United States Ambassador to China
  1941   – J. P. Parisé, Canadian ice hockey player, coach, and manager (d. 2015)
  1941   – Rogier van Otterloo, Dutch conductor and composer (d. 1988)
  1941   – J. Frank Wilson, American singer-songwriter (d. 1991)
1942 – Anna Carteret, English actress
1943 – John Kerry, American lieutenant, lawyer, and politician, 68th United States Secretary of State
1944 – Jon Garrison, American tenor and educator
  1944   – Lynda Day George, American actress
  1944   – Michael Lang, American concert promoter and producer (d. 2022)
  1944   – Brenda Lee, American singer-songwriter
1946 – Rhoma Irama, Indonesian singer-songwriter, guitarist, and actor
  1946   – Rick McCosker, Australian cricketer
  1946   – Diana Palmer, American journalist and author
1948 – Tanimura Shinji, Japanese singer-songwriter
  1948   – Stamatis Spanoudakis, Greek guitarist and composer
1949 – Christina Onassis, American-born Greek/Argentine businesswoman, socialite, and heiress (d. 1988)
1951 – Mazlan Othman, Malaysian astrophysicist and astronomer
  1951   – Ria Stalman, Dutch discus thrower and shot putter
1953 – Bess Armstrong, American actress
1954 – Brad Bryant, American golfer
  1954   – Sylvester Clarke, Barbadian cricketer (d. 1999)
  1954   – Santiago Creel, Mexican lawyer and politician, Mexican Secretary of the Interior
  1954   – Jermaine Jackson, American singer-songwriter, bass player, and producer 
  1954   – Guðlaugur Kristinn Óttarsson, Icelandic guitarist, mathematician, and engineer
1955 – Gene Grossman, American economist and academic
  1955   – Stu Jackson, American basketball player, coach, and manager
  1955   – Ray Kelvin, British fashion designer
  1955   – Christian Sackewitz, German footballer and manager
1956 – Lani Brockman, American actress and director
  1956   – Andrew Lansley, English politician, Secretary of State for Health
1957 – Peter Bagge, American author and illustrator
1958 – Chris Hughton, English-born Irish footballer and manager
  1958   – Tom Shadyac, American actor, director, producer, and screenwriter
  1958   – Nikki Sixx, American bass player, songwriter, and producer 
1961 – Dave King, Irish-American singer-songwriter and guitarist 
  1961   – Steve Nicol, Scottish footballer and manager
  1961   – Macky Sall, Senegalese engineer and politician, fourth President of Senegal
  1961   – Marco Pierre White, English chef and mentor
1963 – Mario Been, Dutch footballer and manager
  1963   – Mark Greatbatch, New Zealand cricketer
  1963   – Claudia Kohde-Kilsch, German tennis player
  1963   – John Lammers, Dutch footballer and manager
  1963   – Nigel Winterburn, English footballer and coach
1964 – Justin Currie, British singer-songwriter and guitarist 
  1964   – Dave Schools, American singer-songwriter, bass player, and producer 
  1964   – Carolyn Waldo, Canadian swimmer and sportscaster
1965 – Jay Bell, American baseball player and coach
  1965   – Gavin Hill, New Zealand rugby player
  1965   – Glenn Lazarus, Australian rugby league player and politician
  1965   – Giannis Ragousis, Greek economist and politician, Greek Minister for National Defence
1966 – Gary Dourdan, American actor
  1966   – Göran Kropp, Swedish race car driver and mountaineer (d. 2002)
  1966   – Erik Honoré, Norwegian guitarist and producer
  1966   – Leon Lai, Hong Kong singer and actor
1967 – Peter Kelamis, Australian voice actor
  1967   – Mo'Nique, American comedian, actress, and producer
  1967   – Chris Shepherd, English animator, director, producer, and screenwriter
1968 – Emmanuelle Charpentier, French researcher in microbiology, genetics and biochemistry, and Nobel laureate
  1968   – Fabrizio Ravanelli, Italian footballer and manager
1969 – Viswanathan Anand, Indian chess player
  1969   – Stig Inge Bjørnebye, Norwegian footballer and manager
  1969   – Max Martini, American actor, director, and screenwriter
  1969   – Alessandro Melli, Italian footballer and manager
1970 – Victoria Fuller, American model and actress
1971 – Willie McGinest, American football player and sportscaster
1972 – Daniel Alfredsson, Swedish ice hockey player
  1972   – Sami Al-Jaber, Saudi Arabian footballer and manager
  1972   – Murray Goodwin, Zimbabwean cricketer
  1972   – Andriy Husin, Ukrainian footballer and manager (d. 2014)
1973 – Mos Def, American rapper 
1974 – Rey Mysterio, American wrestler 
  1974   – Maarten Lafeber, Dutch golfer
  1974   – Ben Shephard, English journalist and television host
  1974   – Gete Wami, Ethiopian runner
  1974   – Lisa Ortiz, American theatre and voice actress
1975 – Gerben de Knegt, Dutch cyclist
1976 – Shareef Abdur-Rahim, American basketball player, coach, and manager
  1976   – Yujiro Shirakawa, Japanese actor
  1977   – Mark Streit, Swiss ice hockey player
1978 – Roy Wood, Jr., American comedian, actor, and radio host
1979 – Valdis Mintals, Estonian figure skater
  1979   – Rider Strong, American actor, director, producer, and screenwriter
1980 – Kristjan Kitsing, Estonian basketball player
  1980   – Adi Keissar, Israeli poet
1981 – Jason Kennedy, American journalist
  1981   – Jeff McComsey, American author and illustrator
  1981   – Paul Medhurst, Australian footballer
  1981   – Javier Saviola, Argentinian footballer
1982 – Pablo Pérez Companc, Argentinian race car driver
1984 – Leighton Baines, English footballer
  1984   – Sandra Echeverría, Mexican actress and singer
  1984   – James Ellsworth, American wrestler 
1985 – Karla Souza, Mexican actress
1986 – Roy Hibbert, American basketball player
1987 – Clifton Geathers, American football player
  1987   – Alex Russell, Australian actor
  1987   – Miranda Tapsell, Australian actress
1988 – Tim Southee, New Zealand cricketer
1989 – Kellie Harrington, Irish boxer
1990 – Derrick Nix, American basketball player
1992 – Tiffany Alvord, American singer-songwriter
  1992   – Dalton Pompey, Canadian baseball player
1993 – Yalitza Aparicio, Mexican actress
1995 – Abbi Grant, Scottish footballer
1996 – Hailee Steinfeld, American actress, singer and songwriter
2000 – Emily Whitehead, artistic gymnast

Deaths

Pre-1600
 384 – Pope Damasus I (b. c.304)
 861 – Al-Fath ibn Khaqan, chief confidant and councillor to al-Mutawakkil
 969 – Nikephoros II Phokas, Byzantine emperor (b. 912)
1121 – Al-Afdal Shahanshah, Egyptian political adviser (b. 1066)
1198 – Averroes, Spanish astronomer, physicist, and philosopher (b. 1126)
1241 – Ögedei Khan, Mongolian emperor (b. 1186)
1282 – Llywelyn ap Gruffudd, Welsh prince (b. 1223)
  1282   – Michael VIII Palaiologos, Byzantine emperor (b. 1225)
1474 – Henry IV of Castile, King of the Crown of Castile (b. 1425)
1532 – Pietro Accolti, Italian cardinal (b. 1455)
1582 – Fernando Álvarez de Toledo, 3rd Duke of Alba, Spanish general and politician, 12th Constable of Portugal (b. 1508)

1601–1900
1610 – Adam Elsheimer, German artist working in Rome (b. 1578)
1686 – Louis, Grand Condé, French general (b. 1621)
1694 – Ranuccio II Farnese, Duke of Parma (b. 1630)
1737 – John Strype, English priest, historian, and author (b. 1643)
1747 – Edmund Curll, English bookseller and publisher (b. 1675)
1797 – Richard Brocklesby, English physician (b. 1722)
1826 – Maria Leopoldina of Austria (b. 1797)
1840 – Emperor Kōkaku of Japan (b. 1771)
1872 – Kamehameha V of Hawaii (b. 1830)
1880 – Oliver Winchester, American businessman, founded the Winchester Repeating Arms Company (b. 1810)
1892 – William Milligan, Scottish theologian and scholar (b. 1821)

1901–present
1906 – Charles Townsend, American fencer, engineer, and academic (b. 1872)
1909 – Ludwig Mond, German-born chemist and British industrialist who discovered the metal carbonyls (b. 1839)
1913 – Carl von In der Maur, Governor of Liechtenstein (b. 1852)
1918 – Ivan Cankar, Slovenian author, poet, and playwright (b. 1876)
1920 – Olive Schreiner, South African author and activist (b. 1855)
1936 – Myron Grimshaw, American baseball player (b. 1875)
1937 – Jaan Anvelt, Estonian theorist and politician (b. 1884)
  1937   – Hugh Thackeray Turner, English architect and painter (b. 1853)
1938 – Christian Lous Lange, Norwegian historian and educator, Nobel Prize laureate (b. 1869)
1941 – John Gillespie Magee, Jr., American pilot and poet (b. 1922)
  1941   – Émile Picard, French mathematician and academic (b. 1856)
1945 – Charles Fabry, French physicist and academic (b. 1867)
1950 – Leslie Comrie, New Zealand astronomer and author (b. 1893)
1951 – Mustafa Muğlalı, Turkish general (b. 1882)
  1951   – Hijri Dede, Iraqi Turkmen poet and writer  (b. 1881)
1953 – Sedat Simavi, Turkish journalist and director (b. 1896)
1957 – Musidora, French actress, director, producer, and screenwriter (b. 1889)
1959 – Jim Bottomley, American baseball player and manager (b. 1900)
1964 – Sam Cooke, American singer-songwriter (b. 1931)
  1964   – Percy Kilbride, American actor (b. 1888)
1966 – Augusta Fox Bronner, American psychologist, specialist in juvenile psychology (b. 1881)
1968 – Richard Sagrits, Estonian painter and author (b. 1910)
  1968   – Arthur Hays Sulzberger, American publisher (b. 1891)
1971 – Maurice McDonald, American businessman, co-founded McDonald's (b. 1902)
1975 – Lee Wiley, American singer (b. 1908)
  1975   – Nihal Atsız, Turkish philosopher, author, and poet (b. 1905)
1978 – Vincent du Vigneaud, American biochemist and academic, Nobel Prize laureate (b. 1901)
  1978   – Paul O'Dea, American baseball player and manager (b. 1920)
1979 – James J. Gibson, American psychologist and author (b. 1904)
1983 – Neil Ritchie, Guyanese-English general (b. 1897)
1984 – Oskar Seidlin, German-American author, poet, and scholar (b. 1911)
  1984   – George Waggner, American director, producer and actor (b. 1894)
1987 – G. A. Kulkarni, Indian author and academic (b. 1923)
1989 – Louise Dahl-Wolfe, American photographer (b. 1895)
1991 – Robert Q. Lewis, American actor, comedian, game show host/panelist, and television personality (b. 1921)
  1991   – Artur Lundkvist, Swedish author and critic (b. 1906)
1994 – Philip Phillips, American archaeologist and scholar (b. 1900)
1995 – Greg Bahnsen, American minister and philosopher (b. 1948)
1996 – Willie Rushton, English cartoonist, author, and publisher, co-founded Private Eye (b. 1937)
1997 – Eddie Chapman, English spy (b. 1914)
  1997   – Simon Jeffes, English guitarist and composer (b. 1949)
1998 – André Lichnerowicz, French physicist and mathematician (b. 1915)
  1998   – Lynn Strait, American singer-songwriter (b. 1968)
2000 – Shaista Suhrawardy Ikramullah, Pakistani politician and diplomat (b. 1915)
  2000   – David Lewis, American actor (b. 1916)
2001 – Mainza Chona, Zambian lawyer and politician, first Prime Minister of Zambia (b. 1930)
2003 – Ahmadou Kourouma, Ivorian author and playwright (b. 1927)
2004 – José Luis Cuciuffo, Argentinian footballer (b. 1962)
  2004   – Arthur Lydiard, New Zealand runner and coach (b. 1917)
2008 – Bettie Page, American model (b. 1923)
2010 – Dick Hoerner, American football player (b. 1922)
2011 – John Patrick Foley, American cardinal (b. 1935)
2012 – Galina Vishnevskaya, Russian soprano and actress (b. 1926)
  2012   – Mendel Weinbach, Polish-Israeli rabbi and scholar (b. 1933)
  2012   – Ravi Shankar, Indian-American sitar player and composer (b. 1920)
2013 – Nadir Afonso, Portuguese painter and architect (b. 1920)
  2013   – Barbara Branden, Canadian-American author and academic (b. 1929)
  2013   – Javier Jáuregui (boxer), Mexican boxer (b. 1973)
  2013   – Sheikh Mussa Shariefi, Indian philosopher and scholar (b. 1942)
2014 – Hans Wallat, German conductor and director (b. 1929)
2015 – Abish Kekilbayev, Kazakh academic and politician (b. 1939)
  2015   – H. Arnold Steinberg, Canadian businessman, philanthropist, and academic (b. 1933)
  2015   – Hema Upadhyay, Indian painter and sculptor (b. 1972)
  2015   – John "Hot Rod" Williams, American basketball player (b. 1962)
  2015   – Ken Woolley, Australian architect (b. 1933)
2017 – Keith Chegwin, British TV presenter (b. 1957)
2020 – James Flynn, New Zealand intelligence researcher. (b. 1934)
2021 – Anne Rice, American author (b. 1941)

Holidays and observances
Christian feast day:
Cian
Daniel the Stylite
María de las Maravillas de Jesús
Pope Damasus I
Sabinus of Piacenza
Victoricus, Fuscian, and Gentian
December 11 (Eastern Orthodox liturgics)
Establishment of Kurdish Women's Union (Iraqi Kurdistan)
Indiana Day (United States)
International Mountain Day
National Tango Day (Argentina)
Pampanga Day (Pampanga province, Philippines)
Republic Day, the day when Upper Volta became an autonomous republic in the French Community in 1958. (Burkina Faso)

References

External links

 BBC: On This Day
 
 Historical Events on December 11

Days of the year
December